Where Shall You Take Me? is the fifth studio album by American indie rock musician Damien Jurado. It was released on March 18, 2003 and was produced by Eric Fisher. Damien Jurado provided the vocals and guitar, Eric Fisher provided the guitar and keyboard and Andy Myers provided the percussion and background vocals.

The songs "Abilene" and "Sucker" were used in television series One Tree Hill.

Track listing 
All songs written by Damien Jurado.
"Amateur Night" – 3:12
"Omaha" – 3:18
"Abilene" – 2:26
"Texas To Ohio" – 2:56
"Window" – 2:21
"I Can't Get Over You" – 3:11
"Intoxicated Hands" – 4:35
"Tether" – 2:34
"Matinee" – 2:58
"Bad Dreams" – 4:06

References

2003 albums
Damien Jurado albums
Secretly Canadian albums